Sabrina Lucchi (born 15 August 1968) is an Italian former professional tennis player.

Lucchi competed on the professional tour in the late 1980s and early 1990s. She reached her career high singles ranking of 210 in 1990, then in 1991 made her only WTA Tour main draw appearances, at the Spanish, Italian and San Marino Opens. At the Italian Open she took a set off the fifth seed Laura Garrone, in a first round loss.

ITF finals

Singles: 3 (1–2)

References

External links
 
 

1968 births
Living people
Italian female tennis players